Libermont is a French commune with a population of 180 (January 2018), located in the department of Oise in the region of Hauts-de-France. It belongs to the Canton of Noyon (before 2015: Canton of Guiscard) and is part of the commune-association Pays Noyonnais.

Geography  
Neighbouring communes surrounding Libermont are Ercheu to the north and west, Grécourt to the north, Esmery-Hallon to the east and northeast, Fréniches to the east and southeast, and Frétoy-le-Château to the south.

Population

See also
Communes of the Oise department

References

Communes of Oise